The Old Masonic Temple is a historic building located in Marshall, Minnesota, United States. Built in 1917, the building was listed on the National Register of Historic Places in 1982 (under the name Masonic Temple Delta Lodge No. 119).  It was nominated for being one of Minnesota's most complete examples of Egyptian Revival architecture.
Delta Lodge No. 119 no longer meets in the building.

References

Buildings and structures in Lyon County, Minnesota
Clubhouses on the National Register of Historic Places in Minnesota
Egyptian Revival architecture in the United States
Former Masonic buildings in Minnesota
Masonic buildings completed in 1917
National Register of Historic Places in Lyon County, Minnesota